is a tram station in Kōchi, Kōchi Prefecture, Japan.

Lines
Tosa Electric Railway
Ino Line

Adjacent stations

|-
!colspan=5|Tosa Electric Railway

References

External links

Text copied in part from the corresponding article in the Japanese Wikipedia

Railway stations in Kōchi Prefecture
Railway stations in Japan opened in 1907